The 2014–15 West Virginia Mountaineers women's basketball team will represent West Virginia University during the 2014–15 NCAA Division I women's basketball season. The Mountaineers were coached by fourteenth year head coach Mike Carey and play their home games at WVU Coliseum. They finished the season 23–15, 7–11 in Big 12 play to finish in a tie for seventh place. They advanced in the quarterfinals of the Big 12 women's basketball tournament where they lost to Oklahoma. They were invited to the Women's National Invitation Tournament where they advanced to the championship game where they lost to UCLA.

Roster

Schedule

|-
!colspan=12 style="background:#00457C; color:#EEB211;"| Exhibition

|-
!colspan=12 style="background:#EEB211; color:#00457C;"| Non-Conference Games

|-
!colspan=9 style="background:#00457C; color:#EEB211;"| Conference Games

|-
!colspan=9 style="background:#EEB211; color:#00457C;" | 2015 Big 12 women's basketball tournament

|-
!colspan=9 style="background:#EEB211; color:#00457C;" | 2015 WNIT

Rankings

See also
 2014–15 West Virginia Mountaineers men's basketball team

References

West Virginia
West Virginia Mountaineers women's basketball
West Virginia Mountaineers women's b
West Virginia Mountaineers women's b